F10, F 10, F.10, or F-10 may refer to:

Aircraft
 Fokker F.10, a United States passenger and cargo airplane
 Hannover F.10, a German passenger and cargo triplane
 Douglas F3D Skyknight, a United States fighter aircraft was redesignated F-10 in 1962
 F-10 Vanguard, export designation of the Chinese Chengdu J-10 fighter aircraft
 A reconnaissance version of the United States North American B-25 Mitchell
 Falconar F10A, a Canadian homebuilt aircraft design

Automobiles
 Ferrari F10, a race car
 Volvo F10, a truck platform
 BMW 5 Series (F10), a passenger car platform
 Datsun F10, a front-wheel drive supermini

Other uses
 F10 (incubator), a startup incubator and accelerator 
 F 10 Ängelholm, a Swedish Air Force wing
 ESP F-10, a guitar
 Factor X, a protein involved in coagulation 
 A computer keyboard function key
 A camera in the Fujifilm FinePix F series
 , a Royal Navy frigate